Dương Minh Nghiêm, known as Dương Không Lộ ( 1016-1094, or 1119) was a fisherman turned Zen master of Annam. His most famous disciple was the monk Giác Hải.

References

1016 births
1094 deaths
Lý dynasty Buddhist monks